Norddeich (Low Saxon: Nörddiek) is a village in the borough of Norden in north Germany with 1,540 inhabitants (2011). It lies in northwestern East Frisia, Lower Saxony on the North Sea coast.

Since 1979 Norddeich has been officially designated as a "state-recognised North Sea spa" and is the largest of its kind on the coast of the East Frisian mainland.

Each year around 175,000 vehicles and 2.25 million people are ferried from the harbour to the nearby islands of Juist and Norderney.  Norddeich is the third largest passenger port in Germany after Puttgarden and Rostock, and the largest in Lower Saxony.

References

External links 

Official tourist pages of the North Sea resort of Norden-Norddeich 

Aurich (district)
Villages in Lower Saxony
Towns and villages in East Frisia